Augustus Frederick Bluett (23 April 1902 – 14 March 1936), invariably referred to as "Gus", was an Australian comic actor.

History
Bluett was born in Prahran, Victoria, son of Catherine Bluett, née McKechnie, and comedian Fred Bluett. While still young he accompanied his parents to England, where his father had an engagement.

On the family's return to Australia he took to the stage and never had any other employment. His successes include:
Hullo Everybody in 1918, his first appearance for JCW
Adrian van Piffle in The Cousin from Nowhere
Timothy Gibbs in Our Miss Gibbs
Jeremiah in The Quaker Girl
Thaddeus T. Hopper in Katinka

Bluett, who had a long relationship with J. C. Williamson's, had been playing Yes, Madame in Melbourne, and only recently arrived in Sydney, had been suffering ill health for some time, but his death from haemorrhage in Sydney Hospital, was unexpected.

His remains were cremated at Rookwood Cemetery.

The radio actress Kitty Bluett (born 1916) was a sister.

References 

1902 births
1936 deaths
20th-century Australian comedians
Australian people of English descent
20th-century Australian male actors
Male actors from Melbourne
Comedians from Melbourne
People from Prahran, Victoria